George Frederick Gyles (November 17, 1877 – February 5, 1959) was a Canadian sailor who competed in the 1932 Summer Olympics.

In 1932 he was a crew member of the Canadian boat Santa Maria which won the silver medal in the 8 metre class. He died in Vancouver.

External links
George Gyles' profile at databaseOlympics

1877 births
1959 deaths
Canadian male sailors (sport)
Olympic sailors of Canada
Olympic silver medalists for Canada
Sailors at the 1932 Summer Olympics – 8 Metre
Olympic medalists in sailing
Medalists at the 1932 Summer Olympics